Heino Kruus (30 September 1926 in Tallinn – 24 June 2012) was an Estonian basketball player (186 cm) who competed for the Soviet Union in the 1952 Summer Olympics. He trained at VSS Kalev in Tallinn

He was a member of the Soviet team, which won the silver medal. He played in all eight matches. Elected to the Hall of fame of Estonian basketball in 2010.

Club career 
Started playing basketball in 1945 as a member of Kalev Tallinn.  With the team of the Kalev Tallinn he won a bronze medal (1945), with the team of the University of Tartu he won a gold medal (1949) and a silver medal (1950) of Soviet Union League Championship.

Achievements

National Team 
 Olympic Games:   1952
 European Championships:   1951,  1953

Club 
 Soviet Union League Championship: 1949
 Estonian SSR Championship: 1946, 1947, 1949, 1954,  1955

Orders

 Order of the White Star, 4th Class: 2001

References

Further reading

External links
Profile at databaseolympics.com (archived version)

1926 births
2012 deaths
Estonian men's basketball players
Soviet men's basketball players
Olympic basketball players of the Soviet Union
Basketball players at the 1952 Summer Olympics
Olympic silver medalists for the Soviet Union
FIBA EuroBasket-winning players
Tartu Ülikool/Rock players
Korvpalli Meistriliiga players
Olympic medalists in basketball
Estonian basketball coaches
Medalists at the 1952 Summer Olympics
Basketball players from Tallinn